The 1912 Ohio gubernatorial election was held on November 5, 1912. Democratic nominee James M. Cox defeated Republican nominee Robert B. Brown with 42.38% of the vote.

General election

Candidates
Major party candidates
James M. Cox, Democratic
Robert B. Brown, Republican 

Other candidates
Arthur Lovett Garford, Progressive
C. E. Ruthenberg, Socialist
Daniel A. Poling, Prohibition
John Kircher, Socialist Labor

Results

References

1912
Ohio
Gubernatorial